Deeya Chopra (born 9 December 1985) is an Indian television actress. She is the sister of Roshni Chopra, who is also an actress and television presenter. She was last seen in Zee TV's daily soap Mrs. Kaushik Ki Paanch Bahuein. In May 2012, she left the show as she had prior personal commitments. She was then replaced by Preet Kaur.

Filmography

Television

References

External links
http://www.rediff.com/movies/2008/mar/13tv.htm
http://entertainment.oneindia.in/television/top-stories/news/2008/left-right-left-new-look-070208.html

1985 births
Living people
Indian television actresses
Indian soap opera actresses
21st-century Indian actresses